Mohammad Hafeez (born 8 September 1974) is a Pakistani first-class cricketer who played for Multan cricket team.

References

External links
 

1974 births
Living people
Pakistani cricketers
Multan cricketers
Cricketers from Okara, Pakistan